Micropterix aureatella is a moth of the family Micropterigidae found in the Palearctic realm (from Europe to Japan), except for North Africa.

Taxonomy
The moth was first described from a specimen found in Carniola, present-day Slovenia, by the Austrian physician and naturalist Giovanni Antonio Scopoli in 1763. He named it  Phalaena aureatella. Phalaena – a word used by Aristotle, meaning the rest of the moths; or possibly a devouring monster or whale, which may be derived from the destructive properties of clothes moths; or possibly from phallus an association by the Greeks of lepidoptera and semen which was suppose to attract moths; or paros i.e. a light and the attraction of moths to lights. The moth was later put in the genus Micropterix, which was raised by Jacob Hübner and the name comes from the small size of the adult; Mikros – ″little″ and pterux – ″a wing″. The specific name aureatella – golden from aureatus, referring to the three submetallic markings on the forewing.

Tinea merianella [Denis & Schiffermüller], 1775 is most probably a synonym of Micropterix aureatella, which is the only purple moth with three golden transverse fasciae within the federal territory of Vienna. The type of T. merianella was destroyed in the Hofburg fire in 1848 and it is thus hard to determine if the species is indeed a synonym.

Subspecies
 Micropterix aureatella aureatella
 Micropterix aureatella junctella Weber, 1945
 Micropterix aureatella shikotanica Kozlov, 1988

Description
The head is yellowish and the base colour of the forewings is purple or bronze with two golden bands and an oval spot towards the wingtip. The adults have working mandibles and feed on the pollen of a variety of flowers, especially those of sedges (Carex species).

Larva
A single larva has been found amongst fungal hyphae in mixed beech, bilberry and oak leaf litter. The larvae are believed to feed on bilberry (Vaccinium species).

Pupa
The pupa is unknown.

References

External links
 www.lepiforum.de: Taxonomie and Photos
 Micropterix aureatella at Naturhistoriska riksmuseet
 Meyrick, E., 1895 A Handbook of British Lepidoptera MacMillan, London pdf  Keys and description page 806

Micropterigidae
Moths described in 1763
Moths of Asia
Moths of Europe
Palearctic Lepidoptera
Taxa named by Giovanni Antonio Scopoli